Gece (English: Night)is a Turkish alternative/indie rock band.

Band history 
Can Baydar and Eren Çilalioğlu had been playing together since their high school days and they joined with  Gökçe Balaban to form the band Gece (meaning "night") in 2000.  Their lineup was completed when Erdem Başer joined them in 2004.

Gece began playing in various bars in Ankara such as  Saklıkent, Limon, Manhattan and If. as well as universities and schools. In 2005 they reached the final of the Roxy Music Days  contest. In 2008, they went into the studio and recorded their first album İçinde Saklı which was produced by Koray Candemir. The band continued performing and made appearances in festivals such as Masstival and Rock'n Coke. In 2010 they signed with Sony Music and released the song Gamsız as a single. After two months, they released their second album (a self-titled album) and the song Ben Öldüm on it as a video clip.

Discography 
İçinde Saklı (2008) - first studio album
Gamsız (2010) - single
Gece (2011) - second studio album
İyi Niyetli Bir Gün (2014) - third studio album
Kalbe Kördüğüm (2016) - fourth studio album
Gamsız (Single, 2010)
Başıma Gelenler (featured by Nilüfer, 2013)
Yıldızlar Buradan Yükseliyor (single, 2013)
Yanımda Kal (Single, 2013)

Video clips 
İçinde Saklı
Öldür İstersen
Bar
Hoşuna mı Gitti
Gamsız
Ben Öldüm
Yarım
Bana Bir Şarkı Söyle
Yıldızlar Buradan Yükseliyor
Yanımda Kal
Derbeder
Bomonti Sokakları
İyileşmiyor
Gönder Gelsin
Kalbe Kördüğüm

References

External links 
Official site of Gece
Lagu76
mp3

Turkish alternative rock groups
Turkish indie rock groups
Musical groups from Ankara
Musical groups established in 2000